Alajos Degré  (Lippa, Hungary (today in Romania), January 6, 1819 – Budapest, November 1, 1896) was Hungarian lawyer, legal historian, author and one of the key figures of the Hungarian Revolution of 1848.

Life
He was born to a middle-class, urban family. His father was a Frenchman who worked as the chief physician of Temes County, Hungary. His mother was Anna Rácz, the raised daughter of a Hungarian nobleman, György Návay. He had a half-brother, Ignác from his father's first marriage and a sister, Franciska. Because of his father's early death Temes County took over the costs of the education of the Degré children. He did his secondary-school studies in Arad and Szeged. Then he went to Nagyvárad where he studied law for two years. In 1842 he started to work as a jurist in Pest where he got interested in politics and made friends with Lajos Kossuth. The liberal ideas inflamed his thinking so he joined these political circles and took part on their events where he was asked to hold a welcome speech for Kossuth. In 1843 he took the attorney's examination and moved to Pozsony (today Bratislava, Slovakia) to work as a royal board notary at the National Assembly of Hungary.

Personal life
He was married to Amália Anna Koller. They had together seven children – four daughters and three sons:
 Erzsébet
 Miklós
 Katalin
 Etel
 Andor (1869–1939)
 Éva
 Lajos (1882–1915)

Works
 Iparlovag – Pozsony, 1844 (premiere at the National Theatre: February 12)
 Eljegyzés álarc alatt – Pest, 1845 (premiere at the National Theatre: April 14, 1845)
 Félreismert lángész – Pest, 1846 (premiere at the National Theatre: February 16, 1846)
 Kedélyrajzok – Pest, 1847
 Két év egy ügyvéd életéből – Pest, 1853
 Degré Alajos Novellái – Pest, 1854
 Kalandornő – Pest, 1854
 Salvator Rosa – Pest, 1855
 A sors keze – Pest, 1856
 Novellák – Pest, 1857
 Az ördög emlékiratai – Pest, 1860
 A száműzött leánya – Pest, 1865
 A kék vér – Pest, 1870
 A nap hőse – Pest, 1870. Két kötet
 Itthon – Budapest, 1877. Két kötet
 Az elzárt gyámleány – Budapest, 1878
 Bőkezű uzsorás – Budapest, 1882
 Visszaemlékezéseim – Budapest, 1883–1884
 Így van jól! – Budapest, 1887

Literature
 József Szinnyei József: Magyar írók élete és munkái II, Budapest, 1893.
 Ernő Vende : Irodalom, tudomány és művészet

References

1819 births
1896 deaths
People from Lipova, Arad
Hungarian Lutherans
Hungarian Revolution of 1848
19th-century Hungarian lawyers
People of the Revolutions of 1848
Hungarian people of French descent
19th-century Hungarian writers
19th-century Hungarian male writers
19th-century Lutherans